Hélène Cortin (born 7 February 1972 in Dunkirk) is a French rower.

References 
 
 

1972 births
Living people
French female rowers
Sportspeople from Dunkirk
Rowers at the 1992 Summer Olympics
Rowers at the 1996 Summer Olympics
Olympic bronze medalists for France
Olympic rowers of France
Olympic medalists in rowing
World Rowing Championships medalists for France
Medalists at the 1996 Summer Olympics
20th-century French women
21st-century French women